is a subway station on the , operated by the Tokyo Metropolitan Bureau of Transportation (Toei), and on the  operated by Tokyo Metro. The Hibiya Line station is subtitled "Kabukiza-mae". The station  is located in Ginza, Chūō, Tokyo, Japan. Its numbers are A-11 and H-10.

Station layout
Higashi-ginza station consists of two stations perpendicular to each other: the Toei and Tokyo Metro stations.

Toei station
Running underneath  Higashi-ginza's Asakusa Line station has two platforms serving two tracks. Platform 2 is for those traveling in the opposite direction, toward  and Oshiage Stations.

Tokyo Metro station
The Tokyo Metro component of Higashi-ginza station runs below . On the Hibiya line, an island station serves the two tracks.

History
Higashi-ginza Station opened on February 28, 1963, as a station on Toei Line 1 and Hibiya Line. Later in 1978, Toei Line 1 was renamed the Asakusa Line.

The station facilities of the Hibiya Line were inherited by Tokyo Metro after the privatization of the Teito Rapid Transit Authority (TRTA) in 2004.

Passenger statistics
In fiscal 2019, the Tokyo Metro station was used by an average of 91,855 passengers per day, and Toei Station was used by an average of 86,726 passengers per day.

Surrounding area
The station serves the eastern part of the Ginza. In the area are the Kabuki-za, the Shinbashi Enbujō (a theater owned by Shochiku), the Tōgeki (a Shochiku cinema), the Electric Power Development Company, and the Courtyard by Marriott Tokyo Ginza Hotel.

References

External links

 Higashi-ginza Station information (Tokyo Metro) 
 Higashi-ginza Station information (Tokyo Metro) 
 Higashi-ginza Station information (Toei) 
 Higashi-ginza Station information (Toei) 

Railway stations in Tokyo
Toei Asakusa Line
Tokyo Metro Hibiya Line
Railway stations in Japan opened in 1963